The Grenada flycatcher (Myiarchus nugator) is a species of bird in the family Tyrannidae. It was formerly considered to be a subspecies of the brown-crested flycatcher (Myiarchus tyrannulus).

It is found in Grenada and Saint Vincent and the Grenadines.

Its natural habitats are subtropical or tropical moist lowland forests and heavily degraded former forest.

References

Myiarchus
Birds described in 1904
Birds of the Caribbean
Fauna of Grenada
Fauna of Saint Vincent and the Grenadines
Taxa named by Joseph Harvey Riley
Taxonomy articles created by Polbot